Ibate (fl. late 3rd millennium BCE) was the 8th Gutian ruler of the Gutian Dynasty of Sumer mentioned on the Sumerian King List (SKL). 

According to the SKL, Ibate was the successor of Yarlagab (Iarlagab). The latter reigned for 15 years while Ibate ruled for three (2154-2151 BC). His successor Yarla (Yarlangab) also reigned for three years.

See also

 History of Sumer
 List of Mesopotamian dynasties

References

22nd-century BC Sumerian kings
Gutian dynasty of Sumer